The 1999 Italian Figure Skating Championships was held in Milan from December 11 through 13, 1998. Skaters competed in the disciplines of men's singles, ladies' singles, and ice dancing. The results were used to choose the teams to the 1999 World Championships, the 1999 European Championships, and the 1999 World Junior Championships.

Senior results

Men

Ladies

Ice dancing

External links
 results

Italian Figure Skating Championships
1998 in figure skating
Italian Figure Skating Championships, 1999
1999 in Italian sport